Coleophora kosteri is a moth of the family Coleophoridae.

References

kosteri
Moths described in 1999